Nganmogne Audrey Murielle (born 14 November 1994) is a Congolese handball player for Mérignac Handball and the DR Congo national team.

She represented DR Congo at the 2019 World Women's Handball Championship.

References

1994 births
Living people
Democratic Republic of the Congo female handball players
Sportspeople from Yaoundé